Substance (also known as Substance 1987) is a compilation album by English alternative dance band New Order. It was released in August 1987 by Factory Records. The album compiles all of the band's singles at that point in their 12-inch versions, along with their respective B-side tracks. The then-newly released non-album single "True Faith" is also featured, along with its B-side "1963" and new versions of "Temptation" and "Confusion".

Substance was released on vinyl, double CD, double cassette and Digital Audio Tape. It sold over one million copies and became New Order's most popular and critically acclaimed album.

It is the companion to a similar singles compilation by New Order's predecessor band Joy Division, also entitled Substance.

Songs
While Substance presents a sizeable collection of singles, there are many omissions and differences to be found from the original single releases:
 "Temptation" and "Confusion" were re-recorded in 1987 specifically for Substance and neither of the original versions appears.
 "Ceremony" is the version recorded after Gillian Gilbert joined the band. The original trio version – the first New Order recording following the dissolution of Joy Division – was only released as a 7" single and would not be re-released until the Singles collection in 2005 and the re-release of Movement in 2008.
 "The Perfect Kiss" (CD and DAT versions only), "Sub-culture", "Shellshock" and "Hurt" are all edited down from their original 12" recordings, the result of storage limitations of the CD, LP, and cassette formats. These edits are present on all copies of the album, despite the increased storage capacity provided by newer manufacturing methods (in particular, CDs in 1987 were only able to store up to 74 minutes of audio prior to unofficial revisions the following year).
 "Cries and Whispers" and "Mesh" are incorrectly labelled as one another, as was the case on the original sleeve for "Everything's Gone Green"; to add to the confusion, the iTunes Store release, based on the CD version, labels "Cries and Whispers" as "Mesh (Cries and Whispers)". This error was corrected for the digital release of the album on streaming services.
 "Sub-culture" is labelled as "Subculture", and "The Perfect Kiss" is labelled as "Perfect Kiss".
The standard tape version, due to the extra space befitting the format, also contains extra tracks in the form of "Dub-vulture", "Shellcock", and "Bizarre Dub Triangle", as well as the actual "Mesh" (mislabeled "Cries and Whispers", again identically to the "Everything's Gone Green" sleeve). Only on the limited edition cassette version does "True Dub" appear, as the last track on the second tape. This second tape, with a total play time of over 100 minutes, was exceptionally long for a commercial audio tape release at the time, which were generally no more than 80 minutes due to the increasing fragility of very thin magnetic tape. On all cassette versions, "Murder" is after "Thieves Like Us" on the first cassette, whereas on the CD/DAT versions it appears on the second half of the album.

The digital release of the album present on streaming services uses the same tracklist as the CD and DAT version of the album; as such, the bonus tracks present on the cassette release are absent, and "The Perfect Kiss" is cut short.

Release and reception 

Substance was released in August 1987 by Factory Records. According to Sputnikmusic, it showcased New Order's mix of post-punk and dance styles with 12-inch singles remixed for club play and became the band's "most popular, well known, highly rated [record] and arguably their most influential". In a contemporary review for The Village Voice, music critic Robert Christgau said that the album's vinyl edition showcases New Order's discipline and chemistry as a band whose musical style is improved upon by the 12-inch mixes: "Pure rhythm machine with an ironically mysterious overlay of schlocky melody to help it go down, this album is a case study in sensationalist art, and I say the world is better for it." Additionally, he called Substance "sublime" and "a revelation" in his column for Playboy. Christgau named it the seventh best album of 1987 in his list for the annual Pazz & Jop critics poll.

In 2003, Substance was ranked number 363 on Rolling Stones list of the 500 greatest albums of all time. According to the magazine, it had sold over one million copies by that time. Rolling Stone ranked the album at the same position in the list's 2012 edition. In a retrospective review for AllMusic, Stephen Thomas Erlewine wrote that the album revealed the band's strength as songwriters with a few of the best pop songs from the 1980s represented by "Blue Monday", "Bizarre Love Triangle", "Temptation", and "True Faith". According to Erlewine, it has been argued that the 12-inch mixes on Substance "represent New Order's most groundbreaking and successful work, since they expanded the notion of what a rock & roll band, particularly an indie rock band, could do." Joe Gross wrote in The Rolling Stone Album Guide (2004) that the album is "pure pleasure" and serves as "a guidebook to 1980s pop", along with Prince's Purple Rain (1984) and Madonna's 1990 compilation The Immaculate Collection. Slant Magazines Sal Cinquemani was less enthusiastic and said that the album is "undeniably a product of its time". In 2005, Will Hermes included Substance in his "definitive guide" to dance-rock for Spin magazine.

Track listings

LP version

CD/DAT version
 Along with the vinyl edition's 12-inch singles compiled on disc one, the CD version included a second disc that collects the B-sides of those singles.

Cassette version

Some releases only contain the first cassette, which compiles the single A-sides. These versions (including the USA Qwest Records release) do not include the song "Murder".
 Some releases do contain the track "Murder" as Track 7 on the (red) tape (Fact 200c Side One / Side Two) but it is listed incorrectly on the inlay as Track 9 (between "Lonesome Tonight" and "Thieves Like Us Instrumental" on the B-sides tape, although it is not actually on the (blue) tape (Fact 200c Side Three / Side Four) . "Cries and Whispers" is also written as "Cries an Whispers" on the inside of the inlay, but spelled correctly on the panel visible when the Cassette is closed. This version concludes with the track "1963", not "True Dub".
 "Cries and Whispers" and "Mesh" are listed in the wrong order on the insert.

Video releaseSubstance 1989''' is the video version of Substance that first appeared in 1989 on VHS; it was released on LaserDisc in Japan in 1991.

The cover is similar to the LP, except "1987" is replaced by "1989" (though the on-screen title is Substance 1983–88) and different background colours are used; the Factory/Qwest release has a grey background, the Japanese VHS release, blue and the LaserDisc, turquoise. The video includes linking sequences which are animated to the accompaniment of instrumental sections from "The Happy One", an otherwise unreleased track from the Technique'' sessions.

Video song listing

Charts

Weekly charts

Year-end charts

Certifications

References

Bibliography

 

1987 greatest hits albums
1989 compilation albums
1989 video albums
B-side compilation albums
Factory Records compilation albums
New Order (band) compilation albums
New Order (band) video albums
Virgin Records compilation albums
Virgin Records video albums